Love, Inc. may refer to:

 Love, Inc. (TV series), an American sitcom from 2005 to 2006
 Love Inc. (band), a Canadian band
 Wolfgang Voigt or Love Inc., music producer